La Tour (as distinct from Latour) is a surname.  Notable people with the surname include:

 Charles de Saint-Étienne de la Tour (1593–1666), French Governor of Acadia 
 Georges de La Tour (1593–1652), French Baroque painter
 Frances de la Tour, English actress
 House of La Tour d'Auvergne, French noble family
 Henri de la Tour (disambiguation), multiple people
Godefroy Maurice de La Tour d'Auvergne, Duke of Bouillon (1636-1721)
Emmanuel Théodose de La Tour d'Auvergne (1668–1730)
Louis Henri de La Tour d'Auvergne (1679-1753), Count of Évreux, builder of Élysée Palace
Théophile Corret de la Tour d'Auvergne (1743–1800), French officer under Napoleon
 LaTour, stage name of American artist William "Bud" LaTour
 Maurice Quentin de La Tour (1704–1788), French Rococo portraitist

See also
 Latour (disambiguation)
 Tour (disambiguation)
 Delatour (De la Tour)